Edward George More O'Ferrall (4 July 1907 – 18 March 1982) was a pioneering British film and television producer and director, as well as an actor.

Biography
More O'Ferrall was born in Bristol, England, to an aristocratic Anglo-Irish family. He was educated at Beaumont College in old Windsor, and the Central School of Dramatic Art. He joined Ben Greet's Shakespeare company, within which he acted in the West End and directed plays and worked as a stage manager; he then joined the BBC in 1936 as one of the first theatre personalities to turn to television in Britain. He presented Picture Page, a magazine topical programme, both before and after the Second World War. He also produced plays, including Clive of India, collaborating with screenwriter W. P. Lipscomb.

In 1948 he was awarded the first Royal Television Society (RTS) Medal for his two-part production of Hamlet. In 1964, he was awarded the RTS Baird Medal for his outstanding contribution to television. In 1973, he was awarded the RTS Gold Medal. He worked for Anglia Television in 1959, serving as Head of Drama and then moved to ATV where he worked from 1964 until retiring in 1967.

Awards
More O'Ferrall was awarded the Baird medal for outstanding contribution to television. His television production of Hamlet was known as an 'Oscar on television'.

George More O'Ferrall's film Angels One Five was nominated for the 1953 BAFTA Award for Best Film and Best British Film. The Heart of the Matter was nominated for the 1954 BAFTA Award for Best Film and Best British Film.

He worked for the British Council in London and moved to live in Spain in 1975. He died in Ealing, London in 1982, aged 74. He left a lasting legacy and is considered one of the greats of film and television.

Selected filmography 
Wuthering Heights (1948)
The Holly and the Ivy (1952)
Angels One Five (1952)
The Heart of the Matter (1953)
The Woman for Joe (1955)
Three Cases of Murder (Lord Mountdrago segment) (1955)
Theatre Parade:
Clive of India (TV play)
Alice through the Looking Glass (TV Play)
Wasp's Nest (TV play)

References

External links 

1907 births
1982 deaths
British film directors
British television directors
Film people from Bristol
British Roman Catholics
British people of Irish descent
O'Moore family